My Father the Hero is a 1994 French-American comedy-drama directed by Steve Miner and starring Gérard Depardieu and Katherine Heigl. It is an English-language remake of the 1991 French film Mon père, ce héros, which also starred Depardieu in a similar role.

Plot

André Arnel (Gérard Depardieu), a Frenchman divorced from his wife, takes his teenage daughter, Nicole (Katherine Heigl), on vacation with him to The Bahamas. She is desperate to appear as a woman and not a girl, so in order to impress a local boy Ben (Dalton James), she makes up more and more ridiculous stories, starting with André being her lover and leading to some bizarre assumptions by the rest of the community.

André is desperate to make Nicole happy (especially as she is increasingly upset by his relationship with girlfriend Isobel) and so plays along with her crazy games, and the stories they make up get increasingly bizarre.

Cast 
Gérard Depardieu as André Arnel, Nicole's father
Katherine Heigl as Nicole Arnel, André's daughter
Dalton James as Ben
Lauren Hutton as Megan Arnel, André's ex-wife and Nicole's mother
Faith Prince as Diana
Stephen Tobolowsky as Mike
Ann Hearn as Stella
Robyn Peterson as Doris
Frank Renzulli as Fred
Manny Jacobs as Raymond
Jeffrey Chea as Pablo
Stephen Burrows as Hakim
Michael Robinson as Tom
Robert Miner as Mr. Porter
Betty Miner as Mrs. Porter
Emma Thompson as Isobel, André's girlfriend (uncredited)
Roberto Escobar as Alberto

Filming
Filming occurred during the summer of 1993. It was filmed on Paradise Island, Bahamas at the One & Only Resort, now known as The Ocean Club by Four Seasons Resort.

Reception

Box office
The film debuted at number 4 at the US box office behind Ace Ventura: Pet Detective, Mrs. Doubtfire and Philadelphia. It went on to gross $25.5 million in the United States and Canada and $19.3 million internationally for a worldwide total of $44.8 million.

Critical response
The film received negative reviews from critics. On Rotten Tomatoes, it has a rating of 20%, based on 15 reviews, with an average score of 4.4/10.

Year-end lists
 Top 10 worst (alphabetical order, not ranked) – William Arnold, Seattle Post-Intelligencer

Soundtrack
The film featured music and appearances by the Bahamian junkanoo band Baha Men. The group's songs create the movie's island soundtrack.
"Back to the Island"
"Mo' Junkanoo"
"Gin and Coconut Water (Traditional)"
"Land of the Sea and Sun"
"Oh, Father"
"Island Boy"

References

External links

1994 films
1994 romantic comedy films
American romantic comedy films
1990s English-language films
Films directed by Steve Miner
Films shot in the Bahamas
Films shot in New York City
Touchstone Pictures films
American remakes of French films
Films about vacationing
Films scored by David Newman
Films about father–daughter relationships
1990s American films
Films with screenplays by Francis Veber